Ebrahimabad Rural District is a rural district (dehestan) in Ramand District, Buin Zahra County, Qazvin Province, Iran. At the 2006 census, its population was 4,028, in 1,081 families.  The rural district has 10 villages.

References 

Rural Districts of Qazvin Province
Buin Zahra County